Shahab al-Din Abu Hafs Umar Suhrawardi (c. 1145 – 1234) was a Persian Sufi and nephew of Abu al-Najib Suhrawardi.
He expanded the Sufi order of Suhrawardiyya that had been created by his uncle Abu al-Najib Suhrawardi, and is the person responsible for officially formalizing the order. Suhrawardi is the author of the ʿAwārif al-Maʿārif, which is recognized as a masterpiece work in Tasawwuf.

Life
Suhrawardi traces his lineage back to Abu Bakr, the first Caliph. From an early age onwards, Suhrawardi studied Islamic jurisprudence, law, logic, theology, Quranic studies and Hadith studies. Suhrawardi quickly excelled in his studies and mastered, at an early age, the Shafi'i and Hanbali madhabs.  Suhrawardi was eventually designated as Shaykh al-Islam by Caliph al-Nasir under the Abbasids.

The ʿAwārif al-Maʿārif 
Suhrawardi wrote the ʿAwārif al-Maʿārif (translated as "Benefits of Intimate Knowledge", or other as "The Knowledge of the Spiritually Learned"). The ʿAwārif al-Maʿārif quickly became one of the most popular books on Sufism throughout the Muslim world. This book was allegedly translated into English by Henry Wilberforce-Clarke and published as "A Dervish Textbook" in 1891, although the Persian text which was the basis for this translation is likely to have been misattributed. It was reprinted by Octagon Press in 1980.

Gallery

See also
Mausoleum of Umar Suhrawardi
Suhrawardy family

References

Sources
 
 Ohlander, Erik, Sufism in an Age of Transition: Umar al-Suhrawardi and the Rise of the Islamic Mystical Brotherhood (Leiden, Brill, 2008) (Islamic History and Civilization, 71).
 Huda, Qamar-ul, Striving for Divine Union: Spiritual Exercises for Suhrawardī Sūfīs (Psychology Press, 2003)
 

Iranian Sufis
1140s births
1234 deaths
13th-century Iranian people
13th-century people from the Abbasid Caliphate
12th-century Iranian people
Sunni Sufis
Supporters of Ibn Arabi
Founders of Sufi orders